Ouroeste is a municipality in the state of São Paulo, Brazil. It is located at an altitude of 500 meters. The city has a population of 10,539 inhabitants and an area of 288.8 km².

Ouroeste belongs to the Mesoregion of São José do Rio Preto and the Microregion of Fernandópolis.

History
Ouroeste has this name because its lands are fertile and are located in the northwest region of the state of São Paulo. It was founded on January 27, 1952 by João Velloso, owner of Fazenda Velloso, then located in the municipality of Guarani D'Oeste. In 1990, it was elevated to the district of Guarani D'Oeste. It became autonomous municipality on December 27, 1995.

Mayors
Nelson Pinhel was the first mayor and vice-mayor Sebastião Geraldo da Silva in the mandate from 1997 to 2000. The second mayor elected was Edivaldo Fraga da Silva and deputy mayor Nelcides de Oliveira Rodrigues in the mandate from 2001 to 2004. The third mayor Nelson Pinhel and deputy mayor Sebastião Geraldo da Silva in the mandate from 2005 to 2008. The fourth mayor Nelson Pinhel and deputy mayor Sebastião Geraldo da Silva in the mandate from 2009 to 2012. The fifth mayor Sebastião Geraldo da Silva and deputy mayor Gilmar Manchi Lopes in the mandate from 2013 to 2016

City
Considered the most sustainable city in the great interior of São Paulo, with a very high index of life, compared to the city of Paulínia, city of the Metropolitan Region of Campinas, which has the highest HDI of the state, in the city of Ouroeste this index has evolved in recent years due to the installation of a multinational in the region.

References

Municipalities in São Paulo (state)